Chandrakanta may refer to:

Chandrakanta (novel), a Hindi novel by Devaki Nandan Khatri, and the title character
Chandrakanta Santati, a series of novels revolving around Chandrakanta and its other main characters by Devaki Nandan Khatri
Chandrakanta (author) (born 1938), Indian novelist and short-story writer
Chandrakanta (1994 TV series), a 1994 television serial based on the novel Chandrakanta
Chandrakanta (2017 TV series), a 2017 television serial based on the novel Chandrakanta, produced by Ekta Kapoor

See also
 Prem Ya Paheli – Chandrakanta, a 2017 TV series